Kevin Cheng Ka-wing (born 15 August 1969) is a Hong Kong American actor and singer who is currently under the management of the Hong Kong television network TVB. Cheng rose to fame in late 2004 after playing his first lead role in the TVB drama Hard Fate.

He is best known for his role as "L.A. Law" in the 2011 TVB legal drama Ghetto Justice, which earned him a TVB Anniversary Award for Best Actor and Asian Television Award for Best Actor in a Leading Role.

Early life
Cheng was born in San Francisco, California, but spent most of his childhood in Hong Kong. He attended Pun U Association Wah Yah Primary School, Wah Yan College, the Hong Kong International School, and Alhambra High School in the United States. During his school days, his mother sent him back to China, where he lived with his uncle for two years before returning to Hong Kong after his mother changed her mind about migrating to the United States. He completed his high school education in Canada. He pursued a civil engineering degree at the California State University in Los Angeles, but did not finish his studies because his father died and he wanted to move back to Hong Kong to be with his mother.

Career

1993–2005
When Cheng was 16 years old, he participated in a singing contest organised by the Hong Kong television network TVB but dropped out halfway because he felt that he was not ready to be a singer at that time. Later, after he moved back to Hong Kong in his early 20s, he decided to continue his pursuit of a singing career. He signed a contract with the record label PolyGram in 1993 and released his first album in the same year to mixed reviews. He was seen as a newcomer with good potential and managed to win several Best New Artist awards in 1994. Cheng's manager later helped him launch his career in the Taiwanese entertainment industry. In Taiwan, Cheng released several Mandarin albums and acted in some television dramas, but all of them were only moderately successful..

Cheng was noticed by Mediacorp after he portrayed the villain "Jiang Yulang" in the 1999 Taiwanese television series The Legendary Siblings. He returned to Hong Kong and signed a management contract with TVB in the following year and started playing minor roles in some television series produced by the network. In 2004, he played a leading role for the first time in the TVB drama Hard Fate.

2006–2010
Cheng soared to popularity after portraying "Alan Shum" in the 2006 romantic drama Under the Canopy of Love, for which he also won the TVB Anniversary Award for Best Actor that year. His singing career also gradually improved after the Taiwanese musician Liu Chia-chang composed a single, "Helpless" (無可奈何), for him. In the same year, he also released a Cantonese compilations album and held his very first mini concert. Niki Chow, Raymond Lam and Miriam Yeung were among the guest singers who appeared at his concert.

Cheng had another critical breakthrough role in the 2007 crime drama The Ultimate Crime Fighter, in which he played the villain "Aaren Chong" and earned glowing reviews for his performance. In the 2008 thriller-suspense drama Last One Standing, his portrayal of the ex-convict "Sing Hei" earned him further critical acclaim and widespread praise from viewers. He was also one of the top five nominees for the TVB Anniversary Award for Best Actor in 2008, but the award went to the veteran TVB actor Ha Yu.

In 2010 Cheng took up the role of 8th Prince in Startling by Each Step (Bu Bu Jing Xin) which later brought his career to greater heights and has since gained him recognition in China.

2011-present
In 2011, Cheng clinched the "Best Actor" award for his role in the legal drama Ghetto Justice at the 16th Asian Television Awards (ATA) as well as winning the Best Actor award at the 2011 TVB Anniversary Award.

In 2016, Cheng starred in the drama Blue Veins, in which he played the role of undead human and vampire hunter, Ying Wut-zoek, who had been given super powered immortals during 500 years ago.

In 2021, Cheng starred in the medical drama Kid's Lives Matter, for which he is placed among the top 5 nominees for the Best Actor at the 2021 TVB Anniversary Award.

Personal life
On 12 August 2018, Cheng married his girlfriend of three years, actress and Miss Hong Kong 2013 Grace Chan, in Bali, Indonesia.

Filmography

Films

Television dramas

Discography

Albums

TVB drama songs

Others

Awards

TVB Anniversary Awards
 Won

Nominated

Others

References

External links

Kevin Cheng Official TVB Profile

|-
! colspan="3" style="background: #DAA520;" | TVB Anniversary Awards

|-

|-

|-

|-
! colspan="3" style="background: #DAA520;" | Asian Television Awards

|-
! colspan="3" style="background: #DAA520;" | My AOD Favourites Awards

1969 births
Living people
Male actors from the San Francisco Bay Area
Alumni of Wah Yan
American emigrants to Hong Kong
American people of Hong Kong descent
Hong Kong male film actors
Hong Kong male singers
Hong Kong male television actors
Musicians from the San Francisco Bay Area
People from Nanhai District
TVB veteran actors
20th-century American male actors
20th-century Hong Kong male actors
21st-century Hong Kong male actors
21st-century American male actors
American born Hong Kong artists